Cupido is the fourth studio album by Argentine singer Tini, released on 16 February 2023 through Hollywood Records, 5020 Records and Sony Music Latin. Following the release of her previous album Tini Tini Tini (2020), Tini departed from Universal Music Latino in 2021, three years after signing with them. She then signed with Sony Music Latin shortly after, and started to begin work on the album.

The album expands on the different genres of Latin music, that includes genres such as cumbia, reggaeton, and features dance-pop, Latin pop, and urbano influences. The album features collaborations with María Becerra, Manuel Turizo, L-Gante, Beéle, Becky G, Anitta, Tiago PZK, La Joaqui and Steve Aoki. Cupido was supported by ten singles; "Miénteme", "Maldita Foto", "Bar", "Fantasi", "La Triple T", "Carne y Hueso", "La Loto", "El Último Beso", "Muñecas" and "Cupido". Aided by Cupidos singles, Tini attained the most top ten hits for any artist in 2022 on the Billboard Argentina Hot 100.

Development

Background 

In 2020, Tini released her third studio album Tini Tini Tini, ending her promotion with a series of live performances in December of that same year. In 2021, Tini left her distribution contract with Universal Music Latino, and signed another distribution deal with Sony Music Latin. During the rest of 2021 and 2022, Tini released singles and songs under Sony.

During the interview with Billboard, in September 2022, she confirmed that her new album would be released soon, around the beginning of next year, and that [the album] songs tell the stories that shaped her life and career. The album's title and release date officially announced on January 26, 2023, on the Spanish program El Hormiguero, where she also pointed out that "'Cupido' is the end of a very important phase for me and spins a whole story that is part of my life and each song has a special meaning." Tini shared the cover and the release date of the tenth single "Cupido" her on Instagram.

Production 
Recording sessions on the album began in 2021 following, the release of Tini's third studio album and the interruption of her second tour due to the COVID-19 pandemic. In early 2021, Tini relocated to Miami, Florida to continue working on the album in a writing camp held by Sony Music Latin. The main part of Sessions were held at 5020 Studios in Miami and EastWest Studios in Los Angeles. Some little part of Sessions were also held in Spain and her native Argentina. Tini enlisted producers Andrés Torres, Mauricio Rengifo, and Richi López to work on the album. The first song she released as the album's lead single was "Miénteme".

Composition 
The album's musical direction was to pay tribute to Latin music genres. The genres featured on the album include urbano, EDM and punk rock. It also showcases heavy influences and elements of cumbia, dance-pop, Latin pop and reggaeton. Each of the songs offers a different cupid, from heartbreak to love, from love to music, family, friendships, to self-love, among others. In each of the lyrics of this album, Tini points to emotions and experiences about how to be reborn, discover and live.

Singles 
"Miénteme" featuring María Becerra was released on April 29, 2021, as the lead single from the album. It reached number 1 on the Billboard Argentina Hot 100, becoming both artists first number-one single on AR Hot 100. The song also peaked at number sixty five on Billboard Global 200, and number forty six on Global Excl. US, making Tini the first female Argentine artists appearing on Global 200 chart.

"Maldita Foto" featuring Manuel Turizo was released on August 19, 2021, as the second single from the album. The song reached at number ten on AR Hot 100, while also reached at number fifteen on US Billboard Latin Pop Airplay.

"Bar" featuring L-Gante was released on November 11, 2021, as the third album single. It reached number one at AR Hot 100, becoming Tini's second number one single on AR Hot 100 chard. The song also reached at number one hundred and twenty five on Global 200.

"Fantasi" featuring Beéle was released on February 17, 2022, as the fourth single from the album. It reached number six at AR Hot 100.

"La Triple T" was released on May 5, 2022, as the fifth single from the album. It reached number one at AR Hot 100, becoming Tini's third number one single on AR Hot 100 chard. In the United States, the song debuted at one hundred and sixty eight on Global 200.

"Carne y Hueso" was released on May 20, 2022, as the sixth single from the album. The song rached at number twelve at AR Hot 100 chard.

"La Loto" featuring Becky G and Anitta was released on July 6, 2022, as the album's seventh single. It reached number seven on AR Hot 100, while also reachet at number eight on Billboard's US Latin Pop Airplay and number sixteen on the US Latin Digital Song Sales. On the Global 200 the song peaked at number one hundred and ninety seven.

"El Último Beso" featuring Tiago PZK was released on September 15, 2022, as the album's eighth single. Like previous single, it also reached number seven on AR Hot 100.

"Muñecas" featuring La Joaqui and Steve Aoki was released on January 12, 2023, as the album's ninth single. The song reached number three on AR Hot 100, while in the United States it reached number one hundred and seventeen, on Billboard Excl. US.

"Cupido" was released few days before the album, on February 14, 2023, as the tenth and final single.

Promotion 
To promote the single "Miénteme", Tini visited various radio stations and shows such as Los Mammones, Los 40, Cuéntamelo Ya! and Radio Disney LA. She also performed the song live at the 18th Premios Juventud awards ceremony. In July 9, 2022, Tini performed "Miénteme" alongside "La Triple T" at the 2022 MTV Millennial Awards.

In July 2022 Tini performed sevral songs in the Uruguayan show Rojo. In December of the same year, she held an exclusive streaming show for the Pantene company, where she performed several songs that she then released for Cupido, as well as several songs from the previous album Tini Tini Tini.

In August 2022, Tini performed "Carne y Hueso", at the 2022 Premios Gardel. The single was also performed at the 2022 Billboard Latin Music Awards.

Tour 

In support of the album, Tini embarked on her third solo concert tour titled Tini Tour 2022. In was announced on November 11, 2021, the same day she released single "Bar". The tour started on May 20, 2022 at the Hipódromo de Palermo in Buenos Aires. The tickets for the show went on sale the same day she confirmed the tour and were sold out in minutes, and then she added four more concerts in a row on 24, 25, 26 and 27 March 2022, at the Hipódromo, that also sold out in minutes.  The tour visited cities across Latin America and Europe. With this tour, Tini became the first female artist to ever sold out 6 Hipódromo de Palermo concerts, as well as the only Argentine artist to sold out a stadium after 20 years.

Critical reception 
Ingrid Farjado from Billboard said that "Tini is more honest and vulnerable than ever with the release of her fourth studio album, Cupido [...] beyond its musical component, Cupido serves as a personal introspection and encompasses the most profound feelings that Tini has gone through in recent years." Valentina Cardona from Fame praised Tini’s ability to blend in multiple genres, stating: "In this new era of self-growth, [Tini] fuses her excellent vocal talent and song composition with urban rhythms, pop, cumbia, and electronica, all while showcasing her essence." Pip Ellwood-Hughes from Entertainment Focus pointed out that Cupido "takes listeners on a journey through love and heartbreak and it features [...] songs that showcase Tini’s ability to fuse genres as well as showing off her voice."

Commercial performance 
Before even it was released, Cupido surpassed more than 4 billion streams globaly. Just five days after its release the album entered the ranking of the ten most listened to albums worldwide on Spotify Global chart, conquering the 2nd position. Cupido also debuted at number 28 on Promusicae Spanish chart, and three days later climbed at top ten reaching the 5th postition.

United States 
In the United States, Cupido debuted at number 8 on US Latin Pop Albums earning 2,000 album-equivalent units in its first week of release. It become her first top 10 and first entry on Billboard albums chart. In addition, the album accumulated a total of 3 million on-demand audio streams for its songs in the tracking week. Cupido also concurrently opens at No. 45 on Top Latin Pop Albums. With this, Tini become the first Argentinian act to debut in the top 10 on Latin Pop Albums chart since Miguel Caló's Siguen Los Exitos de La Orquesta de Miguel Calo in 2016, and first Argentinian woman to claim a top 10 debut since Soledad Pastorutti score entry with the collaborative set Raíz, with Lila Downs and Niña Pastori, in 2014. The album also debuted at number 7 on Spotify Top USA albums chart.

Track listing 
Adapted via Apple Music. Credited adapted via Tidal.

Charts

Release history

References 

2023 albums
Martina Stoessel albums
Hollywood Records albums
Sony Music Latin albums
Spanish-language albums
Albums produced by Andrés Torres (producer)
Albums produced by Mauricio Rengifo